The Gatwick Airport Shuttle Transit is a  long elevated automated people mover that links the North and South Terminals at London's Gatwick Airport. The line is ground-side, and besides linking the two terminals also serves to link the North terminal to the airport railway station. Although sometimes colloquially, but erroneously, known as a "monorail", the transit vehicles are carried on rubber tyres running on a concrete track with twin running surfaces and are steered by separate guide rails.

History 
Until 1987, Gatwick had a single main terminal, now known as the South Terminal. On 26 April 1983, an air-side people mover system opened to link that main terminal to the (then new) circular satellite pier. This was the UK's first automated people-moving system. This system has since been replaced by a walkway-and-moving walkway link, although the remains of the elevated guideway are still visible.

In 1987, a new North Terminal was opened. At the same time the current people mover opened to connect the new terminal to the existing South Terminal and the adjacent railway station. The line initially used Adtranz C-100 people-mover cars, which remained in operation until September 2009, by which time they had travelled a total of 2.5 million miles (4 million km). Gatwick began upgrading its shuttle service in April 2008, with a bus replacement service in place from September 2009. A new operating system and shuttle cars (six Bombardier CX-100 vehicles) was installed, and the guideway and transit stations were refurbished at a total cost of £45 million. The system re-opened on 1 July 2010, two months ahead of schedule; it featured live journey information and sensory technology to count the number of passengers at stations.

Operation 
The transit has two parallel guideway tracks, running on a concrete elevated structure with an emergency walk-way between the tracks. There are enclosed stations at each terminal, which allow boarding from a central platform between the tracks while passengers disembark to platforms outside the tracks. Doors on the edges of each platform line up with the train's doors. There is no connection between the two tracks, each of which hosts a single three-car train shuttling backwards and forward. The line is automatic and driver-less. The normal service uses both trains, with a departure from each terminal every 5 minutes and a 2 to 3 minute journey time. The service operates 24-hours a day, although service levels are reduced to every 10 minutes between 23:00 and 06:00, with only one of the two guideway tracks being used. No fares are charged.

Gallery

References 

Airport people mover systems in the United Kingdom
Shuttle System
Transport in Crawley
Rail transport in West Sussex
1987 establishments in England